Linguatula is a genus of crustaceans belonging to the family Linguatulidae. The genus has a cosmopolitan distribution.

Species
There are four species recognised in the genus Linguatula:
Linguatula arctica 
Linguatula multiannulata 
Linguatula recurvata 
Linguatula serrata

References

Crustacean genera
Taxa named by Josef Aloys Frölich